The Flylight Doodle Bug is a British powered hang glider that was designed and produced by Flylight Airsports starting in 1999. The aircraft is now out of production.

Design and development
The aircraft features a cable-braced hang glider-style high-wing, weight-shift controls, single-place accommodation in the seated position, foot-launching and landing and a single engine in pusher configuration.

The aircraft uses a standard hang glider wing, made from bolted-together aluminium tubing, with its single surface wing covered in Dacron sailcloth. The wing is supported by a single tube-type kingpost and uses an "A" frame control bar. The Doodle Bug differs from other powered hang gliders in that the pilot flies in the seated position. A cloth fairing behind the pilot streamlines drag and provides space for baggage stowage. The propeller is protected on the ground by two support legs that retract automatically when the pilot assumes the normal flying position, though pressure on the foot rest. Electric starting is optional.

Specifications (Doodle Bug)

References

External links

1990s British ultralight aircraft
Single-engined pusher aircraft
Powered hang gliders